Mark Young may refer to:

Mark Aitchison Young (1886–1974), British administrator, governor of Hong Kong just before and after World War II
Mark Young (basketball), American basketball player
Mark Young (wrestler) (1967–2016), American wrestler
Mark L. Young (born 1991), American actor
Mark A. Young (born 1969), California judge
Mark Young (Canadian football), Canadian football player
S. Mark Young, business professor
Mark Young (1987–2009), motorcycle racer who died at the North West 200 in 2009
Mark Young, bassist for Hed PE